Praon is a genus of braconid wasps in the family Braconidae. There are at least 70 described species in Praon.

Species
These 75 species belong to the genus Praon:

 Praon abjectum (Haliday, 1833) c g
 Praon alaskense Ashmead, 1902 c g
 Praon americanum (Ashmead, 1889) c g
 Praon artemisaphis Smith, 1944 c g
 Praon artemisicola Pike & Stary, 1997 c g
 Praon athenaeum Kavallieratos & Lykouressis, 2000 c g
 Praon baodingense (Ji & Zhang, 1992) c g
 Praon barbatum Mackauer, 1967 c g
 Praon bicolor Mackauer, 1959 c g
 Praon bicolour Mackauer, 1959 g
 Praon brachycerum (Ji & Zhang, 1992) c g
 Praon brevepetiolatum Chiriac, 1996 c g
 Praon brevistigma van Achterberg, 2006 c g
 Praon callaphis Mackauer & Sullivan, 1982 c g
 Praon capitophori Takada, 1968 c
 Praon caricicola Mackauer, 1967 c g
 Praon carinum Johnson, 1987 c g
 Praon cavariellae Stary, 1971 c g
 Praon cerasaphis (Fitch, 1855) c g
 Praon changbaishanense Shi, 2001 c g
 Praon coloradense Ashmead, 1890 c g
 Praon coniforme Pike & Stary, 2000 c g
 Praon coreanum Takada, 1979 c g
 Praon dorsale (Haliday, 1833) c g
 Praon exoletum (Nees, 1811) g
 Praon exsoletum (Nees, 1811) c g
 Praon flavicorne Stary, 1971 c g
 Praon flavinode (Haliday, 1833) c g
 Praon fulvum Pike & Stary, 2000 c g
 Praon gallicum Stary, 1971 c g
 Praon helleni (Stary, 1981) c g
 Praon himalayense Das & Chakrabarti, 1989 c g
 Praon hubeiense Chen & Shi, 1999 c g
 Praon humulaphidis Ashmead, 1889 c g
 Praon hyperomyzus Saha, Poddar, Das, Agarwala & Raychaudhuri, 1982 c g
 Praon kashmirense Bhagat, 1982 c g
 Praon kurohimense (Takada, 1968) c g
 Praon latgerinae Stary & Remaudiere, 1982 c g
 Praon lemantinum Gautier, 1922 c g
 Praon lepelleyi Waterston, 1926 c g
 Praon longicorne Marshall, 1896 c g
 Praon megourae Stary, 1971 c g
 Praon minor Stary, 1971 c g
 Praon mollitrichosiphi Agarwala, Saha & Mahapatra, 1987 c g
 Praon muyuense Shi, 2001 c g
 Praon necans Mackauer, 1959 c g
 Praon nipponicum (Takada, 1968) c
 Praon nonveilleri Tomanovic & Kavallieratos, 2003 c g
 Praon occidentale Baker, 1909 c g
 Praon orientale Stary & Schlinger, 1967 c g
 Praon orpheusi Kavallieratos, Athanassiou & Tomanovic, 2003 c g
 Praon pakistanum Kirkland, 1979 c g
 Praon pequodorum Viereck, 1917 c g
 Praon pilosum (Mackauer, 1959) c g
 Praon pisiaphis Chou & Xiang, 1982 c g
 Praon prunaphis Chou & Xiang, 1982 c g
 Praon pubescens Stary, 1961 c g
 Praon quadratum Stary & Schlinger, 1967 c g
 Praon retusae Tomanovic & Kavallieratos, 2002 c g
 Praon rhopalosiphum Takada, 1968 c g
 Praon rosaecola Stary, 1961 c g
 Praon silvestre Stary, 1971 c g
 Praon simulans (Provancher, 1886) c g
 Praon spinosum Mackauer, 1959 c g
 Praon stagona Takada & Rishi, 1980 c g
 Praon staryi Kavallieratos & Lykouressis, 2000 c g
 Praon taisetsuzanum Takada, 1968 c g
 Praon thailandicum (Stary, 2008) c g
 Praon thalictri Stary, 1985 c g
 Praon unicum Smith, 1944 c g
 Praon unitum Mescheloff & Rosen, 1989 c g
 Praon uroleucon Tomanovic & Kavallieratos, 2003 c g
 Praon volucre (Haliday, 1833) c g
 Praon yakimanum Pike & Stary, 1995 c g
 Praon yomenae Takada, 1968 c g

Data sources: i = ITIS, c = Catalogue of Life, g = GBIF, b = Bugguide.net

References

Further reading

External links

 

Parasitic wasps
Braconidae genera